Steve Gunderson (born 1951) is an American executive and politician from Wisconsin.

Steve Gunderson  may also refer to:

 Steve Gunderson (actor), American actor
 Steve Gunderson (Montana politician) (born 1957), American politician from Montana